Xenorhabdus szentirmaii  is a bacterium from the genus of Xenorhabdus which has been isolated from the nematode Steinernema rarum in Argentina. Xenorhabdus szentirmaii produces szentiamide, xenematide, bicornutin A xenofuranone A and xenofuranone B.

References

External links
Type strain of Xenorhabdus szentirmaii at BacDive -  the Bacterial Diversity Metadatabase

Further reading 
 
 
 
 
 

Bacteria described in 2005